Alaa Al Ansari is an Iraqi director. He worked in the United Arab Emirates and Iraq for several years for Ara Art Production, where he directed many television works.

Bio 
Born in "Al-Mashkhab" in Baghdad in 1980, he married and studied at the Institute of Fine Arts in Baghdad and graduated from it.

His works 
 Kulna Al Iraq
 Shofoo Dubai
 Taraji And many TV series and programs

Awards 
 Almoreks Dor

References

1980 births
Living people
Iraqi expatriates in the United Arab Emirates
Iraqi television directors
People from Baghdad